William Metzger may refer to:

 William E. Metzger (1868–1933), Detroit automotive pioneer and organizer of Cadillac and E-M-F
 William E. Metzger Jr. (1922–1944), American airman and Medal of Honor recipient